Yoandry Urgellés Cobas (born July 28, 1981 in Santiago de Cuba) is a left fielder for Industriales of the Cuban National Series. He was part of the Cuban team that won the gold medal at the 2004 Summer Olympics in Athens.

During the 2005-06 Cuban National Series, Urgelles hit .362, with 66 RBIs — second on the team to league MVP Alexander Mayeta. Urgelles did lead the team in bases on balls, with 62.

References

External links
 

1981 births
Living people
Olympic baseball players of Cuba
Baseball players at the 2004 Summer Olympics
Baseball players at the 2007 Pan American Games
Baseball players at the 2008 Summer Olympics
Olympic gold medalists for Cuba
Olympic silver medalists for Cuba
Olympic medalists in baseball
Medalists at the 2008 Summer Olympics
Medalists at the 2004 Summer Olympics
Pan American Games gold medalists for Cuba
Pan American Games medalists in baseball
Medalists at the 2007 Pan American Games
21st-century Cuban people